The Roman Catholic Archdiocese of La Serena is an archdiocese located in the city of La Serena in Chile.

History
 1 July 1840: Established as Diocese of La Serena from the Metropolitan Archdiocese of Santiago de Chile
 29 May 1939: Promoted as Metropolitan Archdiocese of La Serena

Special churches
Minor Basilicas:
Basílica - Santuario Nuestra Señora de Andacollo, Andacollo

Current Leadership
On Saturday, December 14, 2013, Pope Francis accepted the resignation from the pastoral governance of the Roman Catholic Archdiocese of La Serena, presented by Archbishop Gerardo Manuel Donoso Donoso, SS.CC., in accordance with Canon 401.1 of the Latin rite 1983 Code of Canon Law (Bishops must offer their resignations to the Pope for possible acceptance upon turning 75). Pope Francis appointed as the next Archbishop of the Roman Catholic Archdiocese of La Serena, Archbishop René Osvaldo Rebolledo Salinas, who until then had been Bishop of the Roman Catholic Diocese of Osorno, in Osorno, Chile. On October 11, 2018, Pope Francis laicized former Archbishop Francisco José Cox Huneeus amid accusations of sexual abuse against children

Bishops

Ordinaries, in reverse chronological order
 Archbishops of La Serena (Roman rite), below
 Archbishop René Osvaldo Rebolledo Salinas (2013.12.14 – present)
 Archbishop Manuel Gerardo Donoso Donoso, SS.CC. (1997.04.16 – 2013.12.14)
 Archbishop Francisco José Cox Huneeus (1990.09.29 – 1997.04.16)
 Archbishop Bernardino Piñera Carvallo (1983.07.01 – 1990.09.29)
 Archbishop Juan Francisco Fresno Larraín (1967.06.28 – 1983.05.03), appointed Archbishop of Santiago de Chile (Cardinal in 1985)
 Archbishop Alfredo Cifuentes Gómez (1943.06.05 – 1967.03.10)
 Archbishop Juan Subercaseaux Errázuriz (1940.01.08 – 1942.08.09)
 Archbishop José María Caro Rodríguez (see below 1939.05.20 – 1939.08.28), appointed Archbishop of Santiago de Chile (Cardinal in 1946)
 Bishops of La Serena (Roman rite), below
 Bishop José María Caro Rodríguez (1925.12.14 – 1939.05.20 see above); future Cardinal
 Bishop Carlos Silva Cotapos (1918.02.20 – 1925.12.14), appointed Archbishop of Santiago de Chile
 Bishop Ramón Angel Jara Ruz (1909.08.31 – 1917.03.09)
 Bishop Florencio Eduardo Fontecilla Sánchez (1890.06.26 – 1909.03.03)

Coadjutor archbishops
Arturo Mery Beckdorf (1963-1967), did not succeed to see
Francisco José Cox Huneeus, P. Schönstatt (1985-1990)

Auxiliary bishops
Guillermo Juan Carter Gallo (1893-1895), appointed Vicar Apostolic of Tarapacá
Eduardo Solar Vicuña (1914-1920)
Manuel Gerardo Donoso Donoso, SS.CC. (1996-1997), appointed Archbishop here
Luis Gleisner Wobbe (2001-2014)

Other priests of this diocese who became bishops
Pedro Aguilera Narbona, appointed Bishop of Iquique in 1941
José del Carmen Valle Gallardo, appointed Auxiliary Bishop of Iquique in 1963

Suffragan dioceses
 Diocese of Copiapó
 Territorial Prelature of Illapel

Sources
 GCatholic.org
 Catholic Hierarchy
 Diocese website

Roman Catholic dioceses in Chile
Religious organizations established in 1840
Roman Catholic dioceses and prelatures established in the 19th century
 
Roman Catholic ecclesiastical provinces in Chile
1840 establishments in Chile
La Serena, Chile